Saint Canice or Saint Canice's may refer to:
 Cainnech of Aghaboe (515/16–600), Irish abbot
 St Canice's Cathedral, Church of Ireland cathedral in Kilkenny
 St Canice (Parliament of Ireland constituency), borough in Irishtown, around St Canice's Cathedral
 St. Canice, Aghaboe, Church of Ireland church in County Laois
 Mount Saint Canice, convent in Hobart, Australia
 St Canice's GAC Dungiven, Gaelic football club in Northern Ireland
 St Canice's School, Westport, New Zealand